General Samuel Netterville Lowder,  (1813 – 4 June 1891) was a Royal Marines officer who served as Deputy Adjutant-General Royal Marines.

Military career
Lowder was commissioned into the Royal Marine Light Infantry. He commanded a unit of marines which secured the island of Kotka on the coast of Finland during the Crimean War and then commanded a battalion of marines providing support to French forces during the French intervention in Mexico in 1863. He became colonel second commandant of the Royal Marine Light Infantry in November 1864, colonel commandant of the Royal Marine Light Infantry in September 1866 and Deputy Adjutant-General Royal Marines (the professional head of the Royal Marines) in July 1867 before retiring in July 1872.

References

 

1813 births
1891 deaths
Royal Marines generals
Companions of the Order of the Bath
British military personnel of the Crimean War
People from Swindon
Military personnel from Wiltshire